A cereal is any grass cultivated for the edible components of its grain (botanically, a type of fruit called a caryopsis), which is composed of an endosperm, a germ, and a bran. Cereal grain crops are grown in greater quantities and provide more food energy worldwide than any other type of crop and are therefore staple crops. They include wheat, rye, oats, and barley. Edible grains from other plant families, such as buckwheat, quinoa and chia, are referred to as pseudocereals.

In their unprocessed whole grain form, cereals are a rich source of vitamins, minerals, carbohydrates, fats, oils, and protein. When processed by the removal of the bran and germ the remaining endosperm is mostly carbohydrate. In some developing countries, grain in the form of rice, wheat, millet, or maize constitutes a majority of daily sustenance. In developed countries, cereal consumption is moderate and varied but still substantial, primarily in the form of refined and processed grains. Because of this dietary importance, the cereal trade is often at the heart of food trade – with many cereals sold as commodities.

History

Prehistory 

Agriculture allowed for the support of an increased population, leading to larger societies and eventually the development of cities. It also created the need for greater organization of political power (and the creation of social stratification), as decisions had to be made regarding labor and harvest allocation and access rights to water and land. Agriculture bred immobility, as populations settled down for long periods of time, which led to the accumulation of material goods.

Early Neolithic villages show evidence of the development of processing grain. The Levant is the ancient home of the ancestors of wheat, barley and peas, in which many of these villages were based. There is evidence of the cultivation of cereals in Syria approximately 9,000 years ago. Wheat, barley, rye, oats and flaxseeds were all domesticated in the Fertile Crescent during the early Neolithic. During the same period, farmers in China began to farm rice and millet, using human-made floods and fires as part of their cultivation regimen. Fiber crops were domesticated as early as food crops, with China domesticating hemp, cotton being developed independently in Africa and South America, and Western Asia domesticating flax. The use of soil amendments, including manure, fish, compost and ashes, appears to have begun early, and developed independently in several areas of the world, including Mesopotamia, the Nile Valley and Eastern Asia.

The first cereal grains were domesticated by early primitive humans. About 8,000 years ago, they were domesticated by ancient farming communities in the Fertile Crescent region. Emmer wheat, einkorn wheat, and barley were three of the so-called Neolithic founder crops in the development of agriculture. Around the same time, millets and kinds of rice were starting to become domesticated in East Asia. Sorghum and millets were also being domesticated in sub-Saharan West Africa, which were both used primarily as feed for livestock.

Pre-modern history 

Cereals were the foundation of human civilization. In the Mesopotamian creation myth, an era of civilization is inaugurated by the grain goddess Ashnan. Cereal frontiers coincided with civilizational frontiers. The term Fertile Crescent implies the spatial dependence of civilization on cereals. The Great Wall of China and the Roman limes demarcated the same northern limit of cereal cultivation. The Silk Road stretched along the cereal belt of Eurasia. Numerous Chinese imperial edicts stated: "Agriculture is the foundation of this empire," while the foundation of agriculture were the Five Grains. The word cereal is derived from Ceres, the Roman goddess of harvest and agriculture.

Cereals determined how large and for how long an army could be mobilized. For this reason, Shang Yang called agriculture and war "the One". Guan Zhong, Chanakya (the author of Arthashastra) and Hannibal expressed similar concepts. At the dawn of history, the Sumerians believed that if the agriculture of a state declines, Inanna, the goddess of war, leaves this state. Several gods of antiquity combined the functions of what Shang Yang called "the One" – agriculture and war: the Hittite Sun goddess of Arinna, the Canaanite Lahmu and the Roman Janus. These were highly important gods in their time leaving their legacy until today. We still begin the year with the month of Janus (January). The Jews believe that Messiah's family will originate in the town of Lahmu (Bethlehem); in Hebrew, beit lehem literally means "house of bread". Christians believe that Jesus Christ, who is said to have been born in Bethlehem, is the Messiah. In Hebrew, bread (lehem) and warfare (milhama) are of the same root. In fact, most persistent and flourishing empires throughout history in both hemispheres were centered in regions fertile for cereals.

Modern period 

The bond between cereal and imperial powers was not broken, not even in the Industrial Age. All modern great powers have traditionally remained first and foremost great cereal powers. The "finest hour" of the Axis powers "ended precisely the moment they threw themselves against the two largest cereal lebensraums" (the United States and the USSR). The outcome of the Cold War followed the Soviet grave and long-lasting cereal crisis, exacerbated by the cereal embargo imposed on the USSR in 1980. And, called "the grain basket of the world," the most productive "cereal lebensraum" dominates the world ever since.

Having analyzed the mechanism at work behind this pattern, Ostrovsky outlined that the cereal power determines the percentage of manpower available to non-agricultural sectors including the heavy industry vital for military power. He emphasized that chronologically the Industrial Revolution follows the modern Agricultural Revolution and spatially the world's industrial regions are bound to cereal regions. Taken from space, map of the global illumination is said to indicate by its brightest parts the industrial regions. These regions coincide with cereal regions. Ostrovsky formulized a universal indicator of national power valid for all periods: total cereal tonnage produced by one percent of nation's manpower. For the present, this indicator demonstrates a unipolar international hierarchy.

Green Revolution 

During the second half of the 20th century there was a significant increase in the production of high-yield cereal crops worldwide, especially wheat and rice, due to an initiative known as the Green Revolution. The strategies developed by the Green Revolution focused on fending off starvation and increasing yield-per-plant, and were very successful in raising overall yields of cereal grains, but did not give sufficient relevance to nutritional quality. These modern high-yield cereal crops tend to have low quality proteins, with essential amino acid deficiencies, are high in carbohydrates, and lack balanced essential fatty acids, vitamins, minerals and other quality factors. So-called ancient grains and heirloom varieties have seen an increase in popularity with the "organic" movements of the early 21st century, but there is a tradeoff in yield-per-plant, putting pressure on resource-poor areas as food crops are replaced with cash crops.

Common features

Botanical 

Cereals belong to the family Poaceae, commonly known as grass. Grasses have stems that are hollow except at the nodes and narrow alternate leaves borne in two ranks. The lower part of each leaf encloses the stem, forming a leaf-sheath. The leaf grows from the base of the blade, an adaptation allowing it to cope with frequent grazing. The flowers are usually hermaphroditic—maize being an important exception—and mainly anemophilous or wind-pollinated, although insects occasionally play a role.

Some of the most-well known cereals are maize, rice, wheat, barley, sorghum, millet, oat, rye and triticale. Some pseudocereals are colloquially called cereal, even though botanically they do not belong to the Poaceae family; these include buckwheat, quinoa, and amaranth.

Nutritional 
Some grains are deficient in the essential amino acid lysine. That is why many vegetarian cultures, in order to get a balanced diet, combine their diet of grains with legumes. Many legumes, however, are deficient in the essential amino acid methionine, which grains contain. Thus, a combination of legumes with grains forms a well-balanced diet for vegetarians. Common examples of such combinations are dal (lentils) with rice by South Indians and Bengalis, dal with wheat in Pakistan and North India, beans with maize tortillas, tofu with rice, and peanut butter with wheat bread (as sandwiches) in several other cultures, including the Americas. The amount of crude protein measured in grains is expressed as grain crude protein concentration.

Cereals contain exogenous opioid food peptides called exorphins such as gluten exorphin. They mimic the actions of endorphines because they bind to the same opioid receptors in the brain.

Cultivation 
While each individual species has its own peculiarities, the cultivation of all cereal crops is similar. Most are annual plants; consequently one planting yields one harvest. Cereals that are adapted to grow in temperate climate are called warm-season cereals, and those grow in tropical climate are called cold-season cereals. Wheat, rye, triticale, oats, barley, and spelt are the "cool-season" cereals. The "warm-season" cereals are tender and prefer hot weather. Barley and rye are the hardiest cereals, able to overwinter in the subarctic and Siberia. Many cool-season cereals are grown in the tropics. However, some are only grown in cooler highlands, where it may be possible to grow multiple crops per year.

For the past few decades, there has also been increasing interest in perennial grain plants. This interest developed due to advantages in erosion control, reduced need for fertilizer, and potentially lowered costs to the farmer. Though research is still in early stages, The Land Institute in Salina, Kansas, has been able to create a few cultivars that produce a fairly good crop yield.

Planting 

The warm-season cereals are grown in tropical lowlands year-round and in temperate climates during the frost-free season. Rice is commonly grown in flooded fields, though some strains are grown on dry land. Other warm climate cereals, such as sorghum, are adapted to arid conditions.

Cool-season cereals are well-adapted to temperate climates. Most varieties of a particular species are either winter or spring types. Winter varieties are sown in the autumn, germinate and grow vegetatively, then become dormant during winter. They resume growing in the springtime and mature in late spring or early summer. This cultivation system makes optimal use of water and frees the land for another crop early in the growing season.

Winter varieties do not flower until springtime because they need vernalization: exposure to low temperatures for a genetically determined length of time. Where winters are too warm for vernalization or exceed the hardiness of the crop (which varies by species and variety), farmers grow spring varieties. Spring cereals are planted in early springtime and mature later that same summer, without vernalization. Spring cereals typically require more irrigation and yield less than winter cereals.

Growth 
The greatest constraints on yield are rusts and powdery mildews.

Harvesting 
Once the cereal plants have grown their seeds, they have completed their life cycle. The plants die, become brown, and dry. As soon as the parent plants and their seed kernels are reasonably dry, harvest can begin.

In developed countries, cereal crops are universally machine-harvested, typically using a combine harvester, which cuts, threshes, and winnows the grain during a single pass across the field. In developing countries, a variety of harvesting methods are in use, depending on the cost of labor, from combines to hand tools such as the scythe or grain cradle.

Preprocessing and storage 

If a crop is harvested during humid weather, the grain may not dry adequately in the field to prevent spoilage during its storage. In this case, the grain is sent to a dehydrating facility, where artificial heat dries it.

In North America, farmers commonly deliver their newly harvested grain to a grain elevator, a large storage facility that consolidates the crops of many farmers. The farmer may sell the grain at the time of delivery or maintain ownership of a share of grain in the pool for later sale. Storage facilities should be protected from small grain pests, rodents and birds.

Uses

Direct consumption 
An example of a cereal that require little preparation before human consumption is rice. For example, to make plain cooked rice, raw milled rice needs to be washed and submerged in simmering water for 10–12 minutes.

Flour-based foods 

Cereals can be ground to make flour. Cereal flour, particularly wheat flour, is the main ingredient of bread, which is a staple food for many cultures. Maize flour has been important in Mesoamerican cuisine since ancient times and remains a staple in the Americas. Rye flour is a constituent of bread in central and northern Europe, while rice flour is common in Asia.

Cereal flour consists either of the endosperm, germ, and bran together (whole-grain flour) or of the endosperm alone (refined flour). Meal is either differentiable from flour as having slightly coarser particle size (degree of comminution) or is synonymous with flour; the word is used both ways. For example, the word cornmeal often connotes a grittier texture whereas corn flour connotes fine powder, although there is no codified dividing line.

Alcohol 
Because of cereals' high starch content, they are often used to make Industrial alcohol and alcoholic drinks via fermentation. For instance, beer is produced by the brewing and fermentation of starches, mainly derived from cereal grains—most commonly from malted barley, though wheat, maize, rice, and oats are also used. During the brewing process, fermentation of the starch sugars in the wort produces ethanol and carbonation in the resulting beer.

Production statistics 

The following table shows the annual production of cereals in 1961, 1980, 2000, 2010, and 2019/2020.

Maize, wheat, and rice together accounted for 89% of all cereal production worldwide in 2012, and 43% of the global supply of food energy in 2009, while the production of oats and rye have drastically fallen from their 1960s levels.

Other cereals not included in the U.N.'s Food and Agriculture Organization statistics include:

 Teff, an ancient grain that is a staple in Ethiopia and grown in sub-Saharan Africa as a grass primarily for feeding horses. It is high in fiber and protein. Its flour is often used to make injera. It can also be eaten as a warm breakfast cereal similar to farina with a chocolate or nutty flavor.
 Wild rice, grown in small amounts in North America.

See also

 Chillcuring, grain ventilating process
 Food price crisis
 Food quality
 Food safety
 Lists of foods
 Nutrition
 Post-harvest losses
 Pulse
 Push–pull technology
 Zadoks scale

Notes

References

 
Crops